Stephen Pollard (born 18 December 1964) is a British author and journalist. From 2008 until December 2021, he was the editor of The Jewish Chronicle and remains a senior advisor and writer on the paper.

Early life
Pollard had what he calls a "normal, nominally orthodox north-west London Jewish upbringing". His childhood dream was to become a barrister. He attended Mansfield College, Oxford at the same time as Michael Gove.

Career
He was a researcher for Labour MP Peter Shore.

Think tanks
In 1993, Pollard worked for the Fabian Society. In 1996, he joined the Social Market Foundation.

In 2005, Pollard was a Senior Fellow at Civitas. In 2007, he was president for the Centre for the New Europe.

In 2007, it was announced that he would be the first chair of the European Institute for the Study of Contemporary Antisemitism.

Journalism
Stephen Pollard started at the Evening Standard. He then worked at the Daily Express, leaving in 2001. In his final article for the paper, he used the first letter of every paragraph to spell out the phrase "Fuck you Desmond".

He has been a political columnist with The Times and the Daily Mail as well as writing for The Independent and Sunday Telegraph.

In November 2008, he became editor of The Jewish Chronicle. During his editorship, as of October 2020, the Press Complaints Commission and its successor IPSO have made fourteen rulings against the paper. The publication has also been forced to pay damages for libel on several occasions throughout his tenure.

It was announced in April 2020 that the paper was going into voluntary liquidation, despite a planned merger with Jewish News, announced in February 2020. Pollard resigned to join a consortium bidding for the publication's assets. The bid was successful and retained Pollard as editor.

In September 2010, The Spectator apologised and paid damages and costs to the organisers of the Islam Expo conference, in a defamation case involving a blog post written by Pollard and published in July 2008. The apology regretted the suggestion that "Islam Expo Limited is a fascist party dedicated to genocide which organised a conference with a racist and genocidal programme" and accepted that "Islam Expo's purpose is to provide a neutral and broad-based platform for debate on issues relating to Muslims and Islam."

As of 2019, he writes frequently for the Daily Express, and also writes for the Daily Mail, The Sun and The Daily Telegraph.

Views
Pollard is an advocate of market-based public service reforms. He believes that "the state has no business running schools or hospitals" and "I object to the fact I have to pay for (the BBC)". He believes in a flat tax.

He was a signatory founder of the Henry Jackson Society, a neoconservative British foreign policy think tank.

He says that he began to think about Judaism seriously and to feel loyalty to Israel in his mid-thirties.

Publications 
 David Blunkett, Hodder & Stoughton, 2004
 Ten Days That Changed The Nation: The Making Of Modern Britain, Simon & Schuster, 2009
 Falling Off A Clef: The Lives and Bizarre Deaths of Great Composers, The Robson Press, 2014

References

1964 births
Living people
People educated at The John Lyon School
Alumni of Mansfield College, Oxford
British male journalists
British social commentators
English Jews
British republicans